Mijatovac (Serbian Cyrillic: Мијатовац) is a village in Serbia. It is part of the municipality of Ćuprija, and the district of Pomoravlje, in central Serbia.

Population
The population of Mijatovac was 1,712 in 2002. Below is a list of historical population, based on the Serb census.
 1948: 1,661 people
 1953: 1,973
 1961: 1,820
 1971: 1,744
 1981: 1,894
 1991: 1,939
 2002: 1,712

Ethnic composition
Mijatovac is almost entirely Serbian in ethnicity.
As of 2002, there were:
 Serbs : 1,676 (97.89%)
 Yugoslavs : 7 (0.4%)
 Vlachs : 4 (0.23%)
 Montenegrins : 2 (0.11%)
 Macedonians : 2 (0.11%)
 Ukrainians : 1 (0.05%)
 Russians : 1 (0.05%)
 Romanians : 1 (0.05%)
 Others.

References

Mijatovac